Brilliant is an unincorporated community and census-designated place (CDP) in eastern Jefferson County, Ohio, United States, along the Ohio River. It was named after the Brilliant Glass factory that once was located in the town. The population was 1,317 as of the 2020 census. It is part of the Weirton–Steubenville metropolitan area.

Brilliant was formerly incorporated as a village, but it disincorporated on November 24, 1993.

History
Brilliant was laid out in 1819 by western Virginia statesman Philip Doddridge under the name "Philipsburgh". The location was considered significant to commerce as it was the convergence of many roads in close proximity to the Ohio River and parallel to the Wellsburg wharf. A new addition was laid out in 1836 named "La Grange", a name also adopted by the railway station in 1856. In 1880, the Brilliant Glass Company was established and a glass factory was built at La Grange. The town later adopted the name of the glass company and was incorporated as "Brilliant", changing the titles of the railway station and post office.

The Cardinal Power Plant is located south of Brilliant. It commenced operations in 1967.

Geography
Ohio State Route 7, a four-lane freeway, passes through the southeast side of the community, leading north (upriver) to Steubenville and south  to Bridgeport, across the river from Wheeling, West Virginia.

Climate
The climate in this area is characterized by relatively high temperatures and evenly distributed precipitation throughout the year.  According to the Köppen Climate Classification system, Brilliant has a Humid subtropical climate, abbreviated "Cfa" on climate maps.

Demographics

Education
Public education in the community of Brilliant is provided by the Buckeye Local School District. Public high school students in the city attend Buckeye Local High School; Brilliant High School formerly served as the high school in the city.

Brilliant has a public library, a branch of the Public Library of Steubenville and Jefferson County.

References

Former municipalities in Ohio
Census-designated places in Jefferson County, Ohio
Ohio populated places on the Ohio River
Populated places disestablished in 1993